Cornu Luncii is a commune located in Suceava County, Bukovina, northeastern Romania. It is composed of nine villages, namely: Băișești, Brăiești, Cornu Luncii, Dumbrava, Păiseni, Sasca Mare, Sasca Mică, Sasca Nouă, and Șinca.

References 

Communes in Suceava County
Localities in Southern Bukovina